Joel Hart may refer to:

 Joel Hart (doctor) (1784–1842), American physician and diplomat
 Joel Tanner Hart (1810–1877), American sculptor